Robert Mollison Eggo (22 November 1895 – 1977) was a Scottish professional footballer who made over 280 appearances in the Football League for Reading as a right back or half back. He also played for The Wednesday and Heart of Midlothian.

Career statistics

Honours 
Reading
Football League Third Division South: 1925–26

Individual

Reading Hall of Fame

References

English Football League players
Reading F.C. players
British Army personnel of World War I
Association football fullbacks

Association football wing halves
1895 births
1977 deaths
Scottish footballers
People from Brechin
Scottish Football League players
Heart of Midlothian F.C. players
Dunfermline Athletic F.C. players
Sheffield Wednesday F.C. players